Frank Boeckx (born 27 September 1986) is a retired Belgian football goalkeeper. He became Sint Truiden's first-choice goalkeeper in February 2007, replacing Bart Deelkens between the posts. Before that he had also been playing in the teams of KVO Aarschot and Lierse SK. He was also named in a preliminary squad for the UEFA U-21 Championship in the Netherlands in the summer of 2007.

Coaching career
Already in the summer of 2019, while still an active player, Boeckx was hired as goalkeeping coach for Anderlecht's U-21 team. In May 2020, Boeckx confirmed that he would hang up his boots as a player, but continue in his position as goalkeeping coach at the academy of Anderlecht. He later also functioned as a scout and football analyst.

Statistics
Career

Notes

References

External links
Profile and statistics of Frank Boeckx at vi.nl

1986 births
Living people
People from Aarschot
Belgian footballers
Belgium youth international footballers
Belgium under-21 international footballers
Belgian Pro League players
Challenger Pro League players
Lierse S.K. players
Sint-Truidense V.V. players
K.A.A. Gent players
Royal Antwerp F.C. players
R.S.C. Anderlecht players
Association football goalkeepers
Footballers from Flemish Brabant